Epiblema is a very large genus of moths belonging to the subfamily Olethreutinae of the family Tortricidae. Most species occur in the Holarctic; a few in South Asia and Africa.

Species
Epiblema abruptana (Walsingham, 1879)
Epiblema absconditana (Laharpe, 1860)
Epiblema acceptana (Snellen, 1883)
Epiblema albohamulana (Rebel, 1893)
Epiblema alishana Kawabe, 1986
Epiblema angulatana Kennel, 1901
Epiblema aquana (Hubner, [1796-1799])
Epiblema arizonana Powell, 1975
Epiblema asseclana (Hubner, [1796-1799])
Epiblema banghaasi Kennel, 1901
Epiblema batangensis (Caradja, 1939)
Epiblema benignatum McDunnough, 1925
Epiblema boxcana (Kearfott, 1907)
Epiblema brightonana (Kearfott, 1907)
Epiblema carolinana (Walsingham, 1895)
Epiblema charadrias Diakonoff, 1977
Epiblema chretieni Obraztsov, 1952
Epiblema chromata Miller, 1985
Epiblema cirsiana (Zeller, 1843)
Epiblema cnicicolana (Zeller, 1847)
Epiblema concava Diakonoff, 1964
Epiblema confusana (Herrich-Schäffer, 1856)
Epiblema costipunctana (Haworth, [1811])
Epiblema cretana Osthelder, 1941
Epiblema damasceana (Tuleskov & Nikolova, 1967)
Epiblema deflexana Heinrich, 1923
Epiblema desertana (Zeller, 1875)
Epiblema deverrae Brown in Brown & Powell, 1991
Epiblema discretivana (Heinrich, 1921)
Epiblema dorsisuffusana (Kearfott, 1908)
Epiblema ermolenkoi Kuznetzov, 1968
Epiblema exacerbatricana Heinrich, 1923
Epiblema expressana (Christoph, 1882)
Epiblema fiorii Turati, in Turati & Zanon, 1922
Epiblema foenella (Linnaeus, 1758)
Epiblema gammana (Mann, 1866)
Epiblema gibsoni Wright & Covell, 2003 
Epiblema glenni Wright, 2002
Epiblema grandaevana (Lienig & Zeller, 1846)
Epiblema graphana (Treitschke, 1835)
Epiblema grossbecki Heinrich, 1923
Epiblema hepaticana (Treitschke, 1835)
Epiblema hirsutana (Walsingham, 1879)
Epiblema inconspicua (Walsingham, 1900)
Epiblema infelix Heinrich, 1923
Epiblema infuscatana Kennel, 1901
Epiblema insidiosana Heinrich, 1923
Epiblema inulivora (Meyrick, 1932)
Epiblema iowana McDunnough, 1935
Epiblema junctana (Herrich-Schffer, 1856)
Epiblema lasiovalva Razowski, 2006
Epiblema leucopetra (Meyrick, 1908)
Epiblema lochmoda Razowski, 2006
Epiblema luctuosissima Blanchard, 1985
Epiblema lyallana McDunnough, 1935
Epiblema macneilli Powell, 1975
Epiblema macrorris (Walsingham, 1900)
Epiblema mendiculana (Treitschke, 1835)
Epiblema numerosana (Zeller, 1875)
Epiblema obfuscana (Dyar, 1903)
Epiblema ochraceana Fernald, 1901
Epiblema otiosana (Clemens, 1860)
Epiblema periculosana Heinrich, 1923
Epiblema porpota (Meyrick, 1907)
Epiblema praesumptiosa Heinrich, 1923
Epiblema pryerana (Walsingham, 1900)
Epiblema quinquefasciana (Matsumura, 1900)
Epiblema radicana (Walsingham, 1879)
Epiblema radui St noiu & Nemes, 1974
Epiblema ravana Kennel, 1900
Epiblema resumptana (Walker, 1863)
Epiblema riciniata (Meyrick, 1911)
Epiblema rimosana (Christoph, 1882)
Epiblema rudei Powell, 1975
Epiblema sarmatana (Christoph, 1872)
Epiblema scudderiana (Clemens, 1860)
Epiblema scutulana ([Denis & Schiffermuller], 1775)
Epiblema separationis Heinrich, 1923
Epiblema similana ([Denis & Schiffermuller], 1775)
Epiblema simploniana (Duponchel, in Godart, 1835)
Epiblema sosana (Kearfott, 1907)
Epiblema sticticana (Fabricius, 1794)
Epiblema strenuana (Walker, 1863)
Epiblema suffusana (Lienig & Zeller, 1846)
Epiblema sugii Kawabe, 1976
Epiblema symbolaspis (Meyrick, 1927)
Epiblema tandana (Kearfott, 1907)
Epiblema tripartitana (Zeller, 1875)
Epiblema turbidana (Treitschke, 1835)
Epiblema walsinghami (Kearfott, 1907)

See also
List of Tortricidae genera

References

External links
tortricidae.com

Eucosmini
Tortricidae genera
Taxa named by Jacob Hübner